The Simcoe Mountains Volcanic Field is a group of lava flows and extinct cinder cones located in the United States in south-central Washington state, east of Mount Adams. The Northern and central sections of the Simcoe Mountains are located in Yakama Indian Reservation. Although the volcanic field is located near the Cascade Arc of volcanoes, it is a much older intraplate volcanic field, and not a part of the Cascade Arc.

Highest Points 
Most of the volcanic cones are 75 m to 250 m taller than the surrounding land, except for Signal Peak Shield, which is 500 m taller than its surroundings. The highest elevation peaks in the Simcoe Mountains are:

 Jennies Butte (6,410 ft; 1,954 m), a dacite cone 
 Indian Rock (5,823 ft; 1,775 m), a basaltic shield
 Castle Rock (5,656 ft; 1,724 m), a basaltic shield
 Signal Peak Shield (5,100 ft; 1,555 m), a 5.7 million year old mafic shield volcano

Geologic History 
The Simcoe Mountains Volcanic Field is located in the Yakima Fold Belt in the Columbia River Basalt Group. The eruptions occurred in three periods during the Pliocene and Quaternary; the first episode occurred 4.2–3.2 million years ago. the second was from 2.2–1.2 million years ago, and the most recent episode lasted from 1.0 to 0.6 million years ago. The most recent eruption was a trachybasalt lava flow dated to 631,000 ± 27,000 years ago called the "Trachybasalt of Pretty Swamp".

Some of the volcanic activity in Simcoe Mountains happened at the same time as eruptions of Goat Rocks to the northwest. For the last 350,000 years Simcoe was active, there was also activity in the Mount Adams region, but Mount Adams itself had not yet started forming. Indian Heaven, a volcanic field farther to the west, is also generally much younger than Simcoe, becoming active only in the most recent 200,000 years of activity at Simcoe Mountains Volcanic Field.  Mount St. Helens, like Mount Adams, entirely postdates activity at Simcoe Mountains.

See also 
 List of Volcanoes of the United States

References 

Volcanoes of Washington (state)
Mountains of Klickitat County, Washington